The European Union Agency for the Space Programme (EUSPA) is a space agency, managing the European Union Space Programme as one of the agencies of the European Union (EU). EUSPA is a separate entity from the European Space Agency (ESA), although the two entities work together closely.

Overview 
EUSPA aims to ensure that essential public interests are properly defended and represented in connection with satellite navigation programmes of the Union: Galileo and European Geostationary Navigation Overlay Service (EGNOS). The aim of the former is to provide a modern European alternative to the established American system, GPS.

EUSPA provides safe and secure European satellite navigation services while promoting the commercialization of Galileo, EGNOS, and (Copernicus) data and services. It also coordinates the EU's forthcoming governmental satellite communications programme (GOVSATCOM). EUSPA is responsible for the security accreditation of all the EU Space Programme components. By fostering the development of an innovative and competitive space sector and engaging with the entire EU Space community, EUSPA contributes to the European Green Deal and digital transition, the safety and security of the Union and its citizens, while reinforcing its autonomy and resilience.

History and funding

Established in 2004 as the European GNSS Supervisory Authority (GSA), reorganised in 2010 into the European GNSS Agency (also GSA), and based in Prague, Czech Republic, since 1 September 2012, the agency was initially responsible for managing and monitoring the use of the Galileo programme funds and dealing with any matters relating to satellite radio-navigation.

In June 2018, the European Commission proposed to transform the European GNSS Agency into the European Union Agency for the Space Programme (EUSPA), aggregating and consolidating the agency's role for Galileo, EGNOS, the Earth Observation constellation of Copernicus and a new Governmental Satellite Communication (GOVSATCOM) initiative. In December 2020, the European Commission welcomed the political agreement between the European Parliament and the Council on the EU Space Programme. On 28 April 2021, the European Parliament approved the update of the EU Space Programme regulation paving the way to the creation of the European Union Agency for the Space Programme. The regulation creates the European Union Space Agency for Space Programme, defines its competences and functioning, as well as a budget of 14 872 million euros within the multiannual financial framework 2021–2027, the highest amount ever committed by Brussels for space programmes. It entered force on 12 May 2021.

EU's relationship with ESA

The initial aim of the European Union (EU) was to make the European Space Agency (ESA) an agency of the EU by 2014. While the EU and its member states fund together 86% of the budget of ESA, it is not an EU agency. Furthermore, ESA has several non-EU members notably the United Kingdom, which had left the EU while remaining a full member of ESA. ESA is partnered with the EU on its two current flagship space programs, the Copernicus series of Earth observation satellites and the Galileo satellite navigation system, with ESA providing technical oversight and, in the case of Copernicus, some of the funding. The EU, though, has shown an interest in expanding into new areas, whence the proposal to rename and expand its satellite navigation agency (the European GNSS Agency) into the EU Agency for the Space Programme. The proposal drew strong criticism from ESA, as it's perceived as encroaching on ESA's turf.

In January 2021, after years of acrimonious relations, EU and ESA officials mended their relationship, with the EU Internal Market commissioner Thierry Breton saying "The European space policy will continue to rely on ESA and its unique technical, engineering and science expertise,” and that “ESA will continue to be the European agency for space matters. If we are to be successful in our European strategy for space, and we will be, I will need ESA by my side." ESA director Aschbacher reciprocated, saying "I would really like to make ESA the main agency, the go-to agency of the European Commission for all its flagship programs." ESA and EUSPA are now seen to have distinct roles and competencies, which will be officialized in the Financial Framework Partnership Agreement (FFPA). Whereas ESA's focus will be on the technical elements of the EU space programs, EUSPA will handle the operational elements of those programs.

The European GNSS Service Centre (GSC), Madrid

The European GNSS Service Centre (GSC) is an integral part of the European GNSS infrastructure, which represents the interface between the Galileo system and the users of the Galileo Open Service (OS) and the Galileo Commercial Service (CS).
The GNSS Service Center is located in Madrid, in the facilities of the Spanish National Aerospace Institute (INTA), in Torrejón de Ardoz.
The GSC acts as an interface between the Galileo system and the open service users as well as between the commercial service providers and / or users. It also provides users with CS service performance assessment and notifications. The GSC sets up a competence center for OS and CS service aspects, which are accessible to users via the user help desk and the web portal. The information is provided by a communication platform, an electronic library with Galileo and GNSS reference documentation as well as by the ad hoc provision of specific Galileo information. The GSC supports the Open Service and Commercial Service and their applications.

History
The European GNSS Service Center was inaugurated in May 2013 by vice-president of the European Commission Antonio Tajani, Commissioner for Industry and Entrepreneurship and the Spanish Minister of Development Ana Pastor. The center itself was named as a tribute to the former Vice President of the EC "Loyola de Palacio", the then Commissioner for Transport.

On 17 March 2011, a Memorandum of Understanding (MoU) was signed by the Vice President of the EC Antonio Tajani and the Spanish Minister of Transport José Blanco López. This letter of intent outlined the conditions and requirements for hosting the GNSS Service Center (GSC) in Spain and for conducting a Spanish study to prepare the center.  The GSC deployment agreement was published in the Official Journal of the European Union on 23 February 2012, which stated that the global network of ground stations as part of the Galileo program included six centers and one station. The GSC is one of these six ground stations (MCC, GSMC, GSC, GRC).

Area of responsibility

The goals of the center are:
 Providing companies and users with general information: The GSC offers basic services for the user community via a web portal and a user help desk. A special website www.gsc-europa.eu is made available to Galileo users to answer questions.
 Distribution of timely service information: information about the system, system status and other messages for users.
 Support for service provision: exchange of R&D and industry knowledge of individual market segments.
 Provision of current information and performance reports regarding the program status
 Application and product developers with access to market experts in key segments.
 Provision of basic services for the user community via a web portal and a user help desk.
 Exchange of R&D and industry knowledge per market segment.
 Information about the program status and ICD documents (Interface Control Document).
 Access to market experts in key segments.

GNSS Service Center (OS and CS) at FOC
The GSC acts as an interface between the Galileo system and the open service users as well as between the commercial service providers and / or users. It also provides users with CS service performance assessment and notifications. The GSC sets up a competence center for OS and CS service aspects, which are accessible to users via the user help desk and the web portal. The information is provided by a communication platform, an electronic library with Galileo and GNSS reference documentation as well as by the ad hoc provision of specific Galileo information. The GSC supports the Open Service and Commercial Service and their applications.

See also
 Agencies of the European Union
 European Space Agency
 European Union Satellite Centre
 European Union Space Programme

References

External links
Regulation (EU) 2021/696 establishing the Union Space Programme and the European Union Agency for the Space Programme

European space programmes
 
INTA facilities
Organizations based in Prague